Eterno may refer to:
 Eterno (wrestler), Mexican professional wrestler
 Eterno (Luis Fonsi album)
 Eterno (Romanthica album)